Perfect from Now On is the third full-length album released by Built to Spill, and the band's first major label (Warner Bros.) release. It was recorded at the Avast! Recording Company in Seattle, Washington by Phil Ek. Stylistically, the album was marked by its experimentation with longer song structures and philosophical lyrics.

The album was recorded three times. The first time, frontman Doug Martsch attempted to play all the instruments except drums. He and Ek were dissatisfied with the results, so Martsch brought in bassist Brett Nelson and drummer Scott Plouf and recorded the album again. However, these tapes were destroyed by heat when Ek was driving from Seattle to Boise to record additional overdubs. The band rehearsed some more, then recorded the album a third time.

According to a February 1999 Spin Magazine article, the album had sold 43,000 copies up until that point. 

In September 2008, the band embarked on a three-month tour to perform the album in its entirety.

Background 
In contrast to Built to Spill's first two albums, Perfect from Now On contains mostly long, sprawling songs. Martsch wrote the album as a result of his distaste of grunge music such as Nirvana, making the songs long and unconventional on purpose in order to prevent them from being played on the radio. "I didn’t want us to have a hit. I was a little nervous that we might accidentally have a hit, and that our music would be shoved into people’s faces," he said. Martsch wanted Built to Spill's popularity to spread organically through word-of-mouth rather than being promoted heavily.

Despite the length of the album's songs, Martsch rejected comparisons to progressive rock, stating that he listened to Thinking Fellers Union Local 282 instead. Perfect from Now On was Built to Spill's first album released on Warner Bros. Records, which Martsch signed with because they offered health insurance to his family, including his newborn son at the time.

The album was recorded three times. Martsch played all of the instruments except drums on the first version, but he was not satisfied with the results. Only one song from that recording, "Made-Up Dreams", made the final version. The second recording was made with bassist Brett Nelson and drummer Scott Plouf, but the tapes were damaged. The two failed albums cost $20,000 to make. Discouraged, Beat Happening singer Calvin Johnson convinced Martsch to keep trying.

Reception 

Perfect from Now On was released to widespread critical acclaim and is widely regarded as an indie rock masterpiece as well as Built to Spill's magnum opus. Pitchfork ranked this album at #22 on its "Top 100 Albums of the 90s" list. This album, along with 1999's Keep It Like a Secret and 1994's There's Nothing Wrong with Love, is frequently cited as one of the greatest indie rock albums of all time, and has come to influence many modern alternative, rock, and indie acts.

Track listing
All songs written by Doug Martsch.

Personnel

Musicians
Doug Martsch - vocals, guitar, Moogs, bass on "Made-Up Dreams"
Brett Nelson - bass, Moog on "Untrustable / Part 2 (About Someone Else)", Optigan on "Kicked In The Sun"
Scott Plouf - drums, percussion, piano on "Randy Described Eternity", Moog on "Stop the Show" and "Kicked In The Sun"

Additional musicians
Brett Netson - guitar on "Randy Described Eternity," "I Would Hurt a Fly," "Stop the Show," "Velvet Waltz," and "Out of Site"
John McMahon - cello on "I Would Hurt a Fly," "Stop the Show," "Velvet Waltz," "Out of Site," and "Untrustable/Pt. 2 (About Someone Else)"
Robert Roth - Mellotron on "Made-Up Dreams," "Velvet Waltz," and "Untrustable/Pt. 2 (About Someone Else)"
Peter Lansdowne - drums on "Made-Up Dreams" and "Easy Way"
Karena Youtz - "title and some words" on "Velvet Waltz", "Out Of Site", and "Kicked It In The Sun"; backing vocals on "Made-Up Dreams" and "Kicked It in the Sun"

Production
 Phil Ek - producer, recording, engineer
 Howie Weinberg - mastering
 Kip Beelman, Sam Hofstedt - engineer assistant
 Chris Takino - mixing assistant
 Tae Won Yu - design, art direction

Sampling
Rapper Cage's song "Ballad of Worms" sampled "I Would Hurt a Fly". The song appeared on Eastern Conference All-Stars, Vol. 3 and Purple Rain Mix CD Vol. 1.

References

External links
 Interview about the making of Perfect from Now On

1997 albums
Built to Spill albums
Warner Records albums
Albums produced by Phil Ek